Russian Party of Social Democracy (RPSD; ; Rossiyskaya partiya sotsialnoy demokratii, RPSD), initially United Movement of Social Democracy (UMSD or EDSD; ; Yedinoye dvizheniye sotsial-demokratii, YeDSD) was a political party in Russia. It was founded in February 1995 on the initiative of Alexander Nikolaevich Yakovlev, the 'architect of perestroika', who in 1994 had called for forming a united movement of Russian social democrats. At first it seemed that many notable perestroika era politicians with social-democratic or 'generally democratic' views would join the new organization. Among them were A. Golov (leader of the Social Democratic Party of Russia), P.Bunich (Party of Democratic Initiative), I. Kivelidi (leader of the Russian Party of Free Labor), G. Popov (Movement of Democratic Reforms), Y.Chernichenko (Peasant Party of Russia).

However, hardly any of them joined the party when its congress took place on 18 February 1995. Alexander Yakovlev was elected as the chairman, the party's programme emphasised 'social partnership', and at the same time supported constructive co-operation with the government and president Yeltsin. In August 1995, the Party of Social Democracy joined Democratic Choice of Russia, Peasant Party of Russia and similar organisations, forming the Democratic Choice of Russia - United Democrats bloc. No RPSD members were elected. At the moment of registration (April 1995) the party had 4,700 members with little support outside Moscow.

References
 http://partinform.ru/ros_mn/rm_4.htm

1995 establishments in Russia
Defunct socialist parties in Russia
Political parties established in 1995
Social democratic parties in Russia